In the mathematical field of functional analysis, Banach spaces are among the most important objects of study.  In other areas of mathematical analysis, most spaces which arise in practice turn out to be Banach spaces as well.

Classical Banach spaces 

Banach spaces in other areas of analysis 

 The Asplund spaces
 The Hardy spaces
 The space  of functions of bounded mean oscillation
 The space of functions of bounded variation
 Sobolev spaces
 The Birnbaum–Orlicz spaces 
 Hölder spaces 
 Lorentz space

Banach spaces serving as counterexamples 

 James' space, a Banach space that has a Schauder basis, but has no unconditional Schauder Basis. Also, James' space is isometrically isomorphic to its double dual, but fails to be reflexive.
 Tsirelson space, a reflexive Banach space in which neither  nor  can be embedded.
 W.T. Gowers construction of a space  that is isomorphic to  but not  serves as a counterexample for weakening the premises of the Schroeder–Bernstein theorem

See also

Notes

References

 .
 .

Banach spaces
Mathematics-related lists